Three ships in the United States Navy have been named USS Sims for William Sowden Sims. Additionally, one other ship was named Admiral W. S. Sims for the same man. 

The destroyer , served in World War II, sunk by the Japanese, 1942
The destroyer escort , commissioned 1943, decommissioned 1946.
The  USS W. S. Sims (DE-1059) (later FF-1059), commissioned 1970, decommissioned 1991.
 The transport vessel 

United States Navy ship names